The arcane ctenotus (Ctenotus arcanus)  is a species of skink found in Queensland and New South Wales in Australia.

References

arcanus
Reptiles described in 1990
Taxa named by Greg V. Czechura
Taxa named by John C. Wombey